Streets of Pekin is an orchestral suite written by American composer Henry Kimball Hadley while visiting Japan in the summer of 1930.  It became one of his most popular late works.

Hadley was in Japan to conduct six concerts with the New Symphony Orchestra in Tokyo.  As a side trip, the composer had travelled to Beijing as a tourist.  Once back in Japan, while vacationing at a villa in the Japanese Alps, Hadley wrote this orchestral suite in an effort to set in music what he'd experienced during his Chinese excursion.  He conducted its premiere in Japan with the New Symphony Orchestra.

The Suite is made up of seven short movements:
 Great Stone Man's Street
 Sweet Rain Street
 Rickshaw Boy No. 309
 Jade Street (Moonlight)
 Shoe-maker's Street
 Sleeping Lotuses
 The Forbidden City

Performance Materials are available from the Free Library of Philadelphia.

References 
 Boardman, Herbert R. Henry Hadley: Ambassador of Harmony. Banner Press, Emory University, Georgia (1932)
 Canfield, John Clair Henry Kimball Hadley: His Life and Works. Unpublished Ed.D. Dissertation, Florida State University (1960)

Compositions by Henry Kimball Hadley
Orchestral suites
1930 compositions